A French Mistress is a 1960 British comedy film directed by Roy Boulting and starring Cecil Parker, James Robertson Justice, Agnès Laurent, Ian Bannen, Raymond Huntley, Irene Handl and Thorley Walters.

It is based on a stage play, The French Mistress by Sonnie Hale under the pen name Robert Monro, first produced in 1955 at the Theatre Royal Windsor, 
starring Hale.

Production
Production was filmed at Shoreditch Training College, Englefield Green, Borough of Runnymede, Surrey, England, formerly the Royal Indian Engineering College.

Plot summary
A young French woman, Madaleine Lafarge, is unintentionally appointed as the French teacher at an English public school for boys, which is not used to having women teachers. She causes a stir with pupils and other school staff, and complications ensue.

A romance develops between Lafarge and the headmaster's son who is also a teacher at the school. This is a cause of concern for the headmaster when he comes to believe that she is his daughter, from an affair he had during a holiday in France in his youth. He attempts to stop the romance by sacking her, so that she will go back to France, but the boys go on strike and nearly riot.  All the problems are resolved when it becomes apparent that she cannot be his daughter.

Cast

 Cecil Parker as Headmaster John Crane
 James Robertson Justice as Robert Martin
 Ian Bannen as Colin Crane
 Agnès Laurent as Madeleine LaFarge
 Raymond Huntley as Reverend Edwin Peake
 Irene Handl as Staff Sergeant Hodges
 Edith Sharpe as Matron
 Kenneth Griffith as Mr Meade
 Robert Bruce as Mr Ramsay
 Thorley Walters as Colonel Edmonds
 Henry Longhurst as 2nd Governor
 Brian Oulton as 3rd Governor
 Scot Finch as Edmonds, Head Boy
 Richard Palmer as Milsom
 Peter Greenspan as Wigram
 David Griffin as Slater
 Jeremy Bulloch as Baines
 David Diarmid Cammell as Vane
 Chris Sandford as Poole
 Gregory Warwick as Warwick
 Nigel Bulloch as Proffit
 Gordon Pleasant as Benson
 Michael Crawford as Kent
 Pearson Dodd as Church
 Christopher Beeny as Stephenson
 Athene Seyler as Beatrice Peake
 Cardew Robinson as Ambulance Attendant
 Margaret Lacey as Kitchen Maid
 Paul Sheridan as M Fraguier, Previous French Teacher

Box Office
Kine Weekly called it a "money maker" at the British box office in 1960.

Critical reception
Bosley Crowther in The New York Times wrote, "We would have expected something better from the Boultings and Mr. Dell. A good cast of old familiars—excepting Agnes Laurent, a newcomer who plays the mademoiselle — try to do something with it and occasionally do all right with a line here, a facial expression or a situation there. Cecil Parker puffs and pouts as the headmaster, and Ian Bannen stands up stoutly as his son. Raymond Huntley and James Robertson Justice do their acts as other masters in the school. Irene Handl also draws a few fast laughs as the compulsively pugnacious cook, and Edith Sharpe and Athene Seyler cluck politely as the only other females around the place. But the ministrations of the stalwarts do not quite save the day. The Boultings are onto a sticky wicket with that silly sex-scandal stuff."

Theme

Tamahine, three years later, (1963), used the same theme.

References

External links

1960 films
1960s English-language films
1960 comedy films
Incest in film
British comedy films
Films scored by John Addison
Films set in schools
British films based on plays
Films shot at Shepperton Studios
1961 comedy films
1961 films
1960s British films